Jimmy Ryan's was a jazz club in New York City, USA, located at 53 West 52nd Street from 1934 to 1962 and 154 West 54th Street from 1962–1983.  It was a venue for performances of Dixieland jazz.

History 
The location at 52nd Street was one of a row of brownstones with clubs operating in basements. As the last surviving jazz club on 52nd Street, its brownstone — along with all the other brownstones on the north side of the street — were demolished in 1962 to make way for construction of the new CBS Building. CBS had given Jimmy Ryan $9,000 to relocate. The club was owned by partners Matthew C. (Matty) Walsh (1914–2006) and Jimmy Ryan (1911–1963). Walsh, Ryan's brother-in-law, continued ownership following Ryan's death in July 1963 at the French Hospital. Gilbert J. Pincus (1907–1980) — who served as doorman from 1942 to 1962 at the original location and from about 1963 until his death in 1980 — became known as the "Mayor of 52nd Street."

Jazz style 
During the 1940s, three New York nightclubs stood out as centers for traditional style jazz:  Jimmy Ryan's, Nick's in Greenwich Village, and Eddie Condon's just a few blocks away.

Performing artists 
Resident musicians from the 1940s

 Mezz Mezzrow (1943)
 James P. Johnson (1943)
 Art Hodes (1945–1949)
 J. C. Higginbotham (1946)
 Henry "Red" Allen (1946)
 Sidney De Paris (1947–1957)
 Sidney Bechet (1948)
 Max Kaminsky (1948–1949)
 Wilbur De Paris (1951–1962)
 Zutty Singleton (1963–1970)
 Roy Eldridge (1970–1980)

Sunday jam sessions, organized and managed by Milt Gabler

 Sidney Bechet
 Pops Foster
 Hot Lips Page
 Pee Wee Russell
 Eddie Condon
 Mezz Mezzrow
 Kaiser Marshall
 Hank Duncan
 Sandy Williams
 Brad Gowans
 Ben Webster
 Chu Berry
 Coleman Hawkins
 Wildcats

Jazz tunes relating to the club 
 Tony Parenti and his Dean's of Dixieland, "A Night at Jimmy Ryan's," Jazzology (1967)
 Max Kaminsky, Conrad Janis, Davis Quinn, Joe Henshaw, Zutty Singleton
 "Down in Jungletown" (renamed "Down at Jimmy Ryan's")
 "Blues for Jimmy Ryan"
 "Live at Jimmy's", a complete album was recorded live there in 1973 by Maynard Ferguson.

References 

Restaurants established in 1938
Restaurants disestablished in 1983
Defunct drinking establishments in Manhattan
Defunct jazz clubs in New York City
Nightlife in New York City
Defunct restaurants in New York City